Rafe Lee Judkins (born January 8, 1983) is an American television writer, television producer, and screenwriter. He is the showrunner for the Amazon Prime Video television series The Wheel of Time and appeared as a contestant on the 11th season of Survivor, which took place in Guatemala.

Early life
Judkins was born in Salt Lake City, Utah, to a large Mormon family that is said to include 60 first cousins. Rafe's childhood involved him spending time painting rocks and taking apart machines. This was probably because of his mother being an artist and father being an inventor. He moved to Pittsburgh, Pennsylvania at the age of five. His time was spent towards teaching English and science to inner city middle school students. He graduated in 2001 and was selected as the member of the senior class most likely to be on Survivor.

Judkins moved to Providence, Rhode Island, after graduating from the Academy to attend Brown University. His main focus during this time was in biology and anthropology. He also managed the Brown Outdoor Leadership Training (BOLT) program, which is used to give students exposure to wilderness situations with small groups of people. He also founded a cooking class for students which is run by Brown's head catering chef.

Survivor
Judkins participated in Survivor: Guatemala in the fall of 2005. He was part of the Yaxha tribe. Rafe had an early alliance with Gary Hogeboom, Stephenie LaGrossa, Morgan McDevitt and Brianna Varela but back-to-back immunity losses caused the departure of McDevitt and Valera. As of the fourth episode, Rafe had been switched to the Nakum tribe along with three other Yaxha members (Jamie, Stephenie, and Lydia). They managed to persuade a Nakum member (Judd) to vote with them, thus giving them a 5-3 majority on Nakum. In episode five, they won the immunity challenge. In episode six, both teams had to vote a member out, but Rafe won individual immunity. As the reward, he was not in danger of being eliminated, he had the opportunity to watch the other tribe during their Tribal Council, and he was allowed to give individual immunity to a player on the other team. He chose Gary Hogeboom. In episode seven, Rafe, with Stephenie, had to solve a puzzle in order to win tribal immunity. They finished the puzzle in the nick of time, thus helping their tribe go into the merge with a majority.

In episode eight, the teams merged into the Xhakum tribe; Rafe and Lydia worked on the team flag. Rafe's alliance expanded to include Cindy, and although Rafe was tempted to vote out Jamie due to Jamie taunting the tribe members who were in the voting minority, ultimately his alliance voted out challenge threat Brandon. In episode nine, Rafe continued to be frustrated with Jamie, and nearly beat him in an immunity challenge centered on navigating across bridges. In episode ten, Rafe won his second individual immunity in a challenge in which he had to climb through various hurdles and ropes. To his surprise, Rafe began to think he would be seen as a challenge threat. Jamie offered Rafe a final 3 alliance with Judd, but Rafe, increasingly upset by Jamie's paranoia, convinced alliance partners Stephenie and Lydia that it was the right time to vote Jamie out. Afterwards, he worked with Stephenie and Lydia to overthrow Judd, giving Danni a second chance at the game.

Rafe's main alliance was with Stephenie, and his plan was to eliminate every player he felt would lose to her in the final 2, thus ensuring she would take him if she won the final immunity. He wanted another partner who would take him to the final 2, and this was Danni. As a result, after winning the a complicated maze/puzzle immunity challenge, he engineered Lydia's departure, in spite of her being no threat for the upcoming endurance challenge. At that challenge, Rafe lost his concentration and was eliminated. Danni then beat Stephenie. After he saw a sobbing Stephenie, he told Danni that any promises that she had made to him were no longer existent and that she could take Steph to the final 2 if Danni wanted to. Due to her belief that she might not beat Rafe in front of the jury, Danni took Steph to the final 2; although Rafe felt she made a good strategic move, he was bothered by her decision as he had hoped she would take him based on their bond, not on a promise she had made. While on the jury, Rafe cast the sole vote for Stephenie. Rafe did not hold a lasting grudge against Danni - he attended a Kansas City Chiefs game with her and she listed him as one of the people she had remained friends with after the show ended.

Television career after Survivor
After Survivor, Judkins moved to Los Angeles to pursue a career in screenwriting. He was staffed on the short-lived Christian Slater drama, My Own Worst Enemy. After that, he was hired on the third season of Chuck. Some of his episodes were Chuck Versus the Tic Tac, Chuck Versus the Honeymooners, Chuck Versus the First Fight, Chuck Versus the Push Mix, and the first of half of the series finale Chuck Versus Sarah. After a stint on Hemlock Grove he began writing for Marvel's Agents of SHIELD.

On April 20, 2017, it was announced that Judkins would be writing and showrunning the TV adaptation of The Wheel of Time. In May 2018, it was announced that Judkins was showrunning and writing The Last Amazons alongside director/executive producer Ava DuVernay, a television show about the real Amazon women in ancient Greece.

Filmography

References

External links

Rafe Judkins biography for Survivor: Guatemala at CBS.com

1983 births
American television writers
American male television writers
Brown University alumni
Former Latter Day Saints
American gay writers
LGBT people from Pennsylvania
LGBT people from Utah
Living people
Survivor (American TV series) contestants
Writers from Pittsburgh
Writers from Salt Lake City
Screenwriters from Pennsylvania
Screenwriters from Utah
Sewickley Academy alumni